The Canadian federal budget for fiscal year 1978–1979 presented by Minister of Finance Jean Chrétien in the House of Commons of Canada on 10 April 1978. It is the fifth budget of the 30th Parliament and the first presented by Jean Chrétien.

Taxes

Personal income taxes
The most important element of the budget is retirement savings reform. Prior to the budget, RRSP owners who turned 71 were forced to either:
 Invest the proceeds for the RRSP plan in a life annuity;
 Have the proceeds withdrawn in a lump-sum and included in the taxpayer's taxable income.

Starting on the day of the budget speech, two additional options were provided:
 RRSP could be rolled over tax free in a Registered Retirement Income Fund (RRIF) a newly-created investment vehicle with minimum yearly withdrawals to take until age 90.
 Fixed-term annuity up to age 90 could be acquired instead of life annuities.

The conversion of the RRSP into annuities or RRIF must occur between ages 60 and 70 (included).

Other less substantial changes to personal income tax rules were enacted as part of the budget:
 Lodging and board provided by employers on remote work sites were made non taxable for all taxpayers;
 Tax-free rollover provisions are extended to incorporated family farms.

Corporate income taxes
The budget contained a series of technical changes and improved support for R&D expenditures:
 A 10-year special allowance of 50% is provided for increased R&D expenditures. This measure is estimated to cost $50 million in federal revenues;
 Increased tax incentives were provided to promote energy production;
 Faster depreciation (through increased capital cost allowance rates) are made available to railway companies for equipment acquired between 10 April 1978 and 1982.

Sales taxes 
The most notorious measure of the April 1978 budget is the temporary reduction of retail sales taxes aimed at stimulating the economy. The federal government made a first proposal to provincial governments in 1977 by offering a 50% compensation for a 2%-cut in provincial retail sales tax rates. The proposal was rejected by the provinces. An enhanced proposal is made in the budget:
 A six-month 2%-cut financed by the federal government that must be simultaneously matched by a 1%-cut financed by provincial treasuries;
 A six-month 2%-cut financed by Ottawa that must be followed by a three-month 2%-cut integrally financed by the provinces ;
 For Atlantic provinces, Ottawa agreed to finance integrally a six-month 3%-cut.

Ontario and Manitoba opted for the first option (six-month 3% cut with a 2/3 compensation from the federal government) while British Columbia and Saskatchewan opted for the second. At the time of the budget speech, the Quebec government had not officially answered to the federal proposal.

Two days after the budget speech, the Premier of Quebec René Lévesque vehemently rejected the federal offer during question period in the Quebec National Assembly.

Notes and references

Notes

References
 Budget in Brief
 Budget Plan

 Other references

1978, April
Federal budget, April
Canada, April
Federal budget, April